Roseisle, also known as Old Town, is a village in the parish of Duffus, near Elgin, Moray, in the Strathspey region of Scotland.

History
A charter was given to William, son of Freskin from King William I of Scotland, of the lands of Roseisle between 1165 and 1171. Roseisle was sold by Alexander Stuart, 5th Earl of Moray to Alexander Sutherland, 1st Lord Duffus in 1653. The estate was purchased by Archibald Dunbar of Northfield who then sold Roseisle to John Gordon, 16th Earl of Sutherland in 1729.

Notable people
Ethel Baxter, member of the Baxters food company, cook and businesswoman.

See also

 Roseisle, Manitoba
 Roseisle distillery
 List of places in Moray

References

Moray